Pieter van Boven (10 June 1898 – 18 June 1952) was a Dutch fencer. He competed in the individual and team épée events at the 1924 Summer Olympics.

References

External links
 

1898 births
1952 deaths
People from Borger-Odoorn
Dutch male fencers
Olympic fencers of the Netherlands
Fencers at the 1924 Summer Olympics
Sportspeople from Drenthe
20th-century Dutch people